Acta Geotechnica Slovenica is a biannual peer-reviewed scientific journal published by the University of Maribor, Faculty of Civil Engineering. The editor-in-chief is Ludvik Trauner (University of Maribor). The journal covers fundamental and applied research in the areas of geomechanics and geotechnical engineering. Topics covered include soil and rock mechanics, engineering geology, environmental geotechnics, geosynthetics, numerical and analytical methods, computer modelling, field and laboratory testing.

History 
Acta Geotechnica Slovenica was established in 2004 by:
 University of Maribor, Faculty of Civil Engineering
 University of Ljubljana, Faculty of Civil and Geodetic Engineering and Faculty of Natural Sciences and Engineering
 Slovenian Geotechnical Society
 Society for Underground and Geotechnical Constructions

Abstracting and indexing 
This journal is abstracted and indexed in:
 Science Citation Index Expanded 
 International Construction database
 GeoRef
According to the Journal Citation Reports, the journal has a 2012 impact factor of  0.10.

See also 
 List of academic journals published in Slovenia

References

External links 
 

Engineering journals
University of Maribor
Biannual journals
Academic journals published in Slovenia
Publications established in 2004
Academic journals published by universities and colleges
Mining journals